Morses Gulch is a coastal valley in Marin County, California, United States.

It descends the western slope of Bolinas Ridge and drains into Bolinas Lagoon.

References

External links

See also
 List of watercourses in the San Francisco Bay Area

Rivers of Marin County, California
Rivers of Northern California